The Battle of Mi County was fought at Xinmi, near Zhengzhou between forces supporting Chiang Kai-shek and those opposing him.

Bibliography
中華民國國防大學編，《中國現代軍事史主要戰役表》

Conflicts in 1930